1-900 or 06 is a 1994 Dutch erotic romantic drama film directed by Theo Van Gogh. The screenplay was based on a stage play by Johan van Doesburg. The film depicts a relationship based on telephone sex which gets out of hand. The film was selected as the Dutch entry for the Best Foreign Language Film at the 67th Academy Awards, but was not accepted as a nominee.

Cast
Ariane Schluter	... 	Sarah Wevers
Ad van Kempen	... 	Thomas Venema

Production 
The film was shot in just 5 days by Van Gogh. Just like in the stage play, the actors improvised a lot.

See also
 List of submissions to the 67th Academy Awards for Best Foreign Language Film
 List of Dutch submissions for the Academy Award for Best Foreign Language Film

References

External links 
 

1994 films
1990s Dutch-language films
1990s erotic drama films
1990s erotic thriller films
Films directed by Theo van Gogh
Films shot in the Netherlands
Erotic romance films
Dutch erotic drama films
1994 drama films